Vitaly Zdorovetskiy (born March 8, 1992), better known by his YouTube username VitalyzdTv, is a US-based Russian YouTube personality, content creator and website owner.
His YouTube videos, as of November 2021, have reached over 1.8 billion views and over 10 million subscribers, while his video blog channel has more than 270 million views and 1.93 million subscribers.

Early life and education
Zdorovetskiy was born in 1992 in Murmansk, Russia. As a child, he lived in Odesa, Ukraine. He grew up in Boca Raton, Florida and attended Park Vista Community High School.

Zdorovetskiy attempted to become a professional skateboarder at an early age but quit due to injuries.

In the video titled "Why I Did Porn!", he tells his audience he got his first job at age 15 as a garbage collector making $5.00 an hour. His second job was a sign-spinner dressed as Uncle Sam making $20 for 3 hours of work. After that, Vitaly picked up a job as a bus boy at a restaurant in Miami, Florida. Shortly after turning 18, Zdorovetskiy took part in an adult film scene with pornographic actress Diamond Kitty for the adult entertainment company Bang Bros in 2011.

Career
In 2012, Zdorovetskiy received his first significant success, with the video "Miami Zombie Attack Prank!" Inspired by the cannibal attack of a homeless man in Miami in May 2012, he dressed up as a zombie and traveled to some of the poorest neighborhoods in Miami to scare random bystanders. By January 2015, the "Miami Zombie Attack Prank!" had been viewed more than 30 million times. A sequel video prank was produced in Columbus, Ohio.

On June 16, 2012, Zdorovetskiy and cameraman Jonathan Vanegas filmed the "Russian Hitman Prank". As part of the prank, Zdorovetskiy approached a Boca Raton Resort man and informed him they had 60 seconds to get away from a briefcase he placed on the ground. After Zdorovetskiy revealed the whole thing to be a prank and that there was a hidden camera nearby, the man started attacking him and his partner and called the police. Zdorovetskiy was arrested by Boca Raton police department, facing a maximum of 15 years in prison  on charges of threatening to detonate a bomb.  Vitaly decided to fight the charges and possible prison sentence and retained top criminal defense attorney, Roger P. Foley, to take the case to trial.  Shortly after taking the deposition of the alleged victim, the case was dismissed by the prosecutor.  At the time of the prank, Zdorovetskiy's YouTube channel had only about 100,000 subscribers, but after the incident his channel grew to over four million subscribers within just over a year.

On July 20, 2013, Zdorovetskiy released the video "Extreme Homeless Man Makeover", in which he befriends a homeless man named Martin and provides him with new clothes and a hotel room. The video posting resulted in a job offer that Martin accepted. He was also reunited with his wife. The project also included an attempt to raise money to have Martin's teeth fixed, for which Zdorovetskiy was able to raise about $10,000 online. The fundraising campaign was canceled before it was completed, because of Zdorovetskiy's criminal history. However, Zdorovetskiy received several offers from surgeons to do the dental work for free. The surgery and the video story was featured on television news casts including the Good Day LA Fox morning show.

His "Gold Digger Prank", featuring a woman who rejects his advances until she believes he drives a Lamborghini Gallardo sports car, generated more than 18 million views in its first week of posting, making VitalyzdTV the third most watched YouTube channel in the world during that week with over 45 million views.

On October 15, 2014, Zdorovetskiy pulled a prank which involved himself dressing up as Leatherface from The Texas Chain Saw Massacre, pretending to saw off the legs of Hanhart syndrome patient Nick Santonastasso with a chainsaw in front of unsuspecting witnesses. The prank went viral, receiving over 30 million views in 3 weeks.

While being in Croatia in 2015, he pranked former Croatian prime minister Ivo Sanader, while Sanader was leaving Remetinec prison where he was serving his sentence for corruption charges by jumping on Sanader's car while he and his lawyers were inside.

In November 2015, Lionsgate officially acquired worldwide distribution rights for a film in which Zdorovetskiy starred, Natural Born Pranksters.

In 2022, Zdorovetskiy became an active member on the subsciption-based website OnlyFans. On 2 July, he announced on Twitter that he was about to release a sex tape. Zdorovetskiy subsequently released a series of pornographic videos with fellow Onlyfans content creator Delia Rose, advertising themselves on Twitter.

Controversies and arrests
In 2014, Zdorovetskiy was arrested for invading the field during the 2014 FIFA World Cup Final between Germany and Argentina in Brazil.

On May 25, 2016, he was arrested for trespassing after climbing the Hollywood Sign, as part of a video stunt. On June 10, he was again arrested for streaking during Game 4 of the NBA Finals between the Cleveland Cavaliers and the Golden State Warriors, with security quickly apprehending and arresting the YouTuber.

During the bottom of the 7th inning in Game 5 of the 2017 World Series, he was arrested for running onto the field at Minute Maid Park shortly after Carlos Correa of the Houston Astros hit a home run.

Zdorovetskiy is currently facing a ban from attending major sporting events for his antics. However, during the 2019 Cricket World Cup Final between England and New Zealand, Zdorovetskiy's mother, Elena Vulitsky attempted to emulate her son's girlfriend's success at the Champions League final. Vulitsky was pictured wearing clothing with the "Vitaly Uncensored" logo on it, but was stopped by stewards from streaking.

In January 2020, Zdorovetskiy was arrested and spent five days in an Egyptian jail after climbing the Pyramids of Giza.

In April 2020, he was arrested and later charged for aggravated battery by Miami Beach Police. Zdorovetskiy allegedly tackled a female jogger and struck her multiple times in the head and chest. He was released from custody after posting a $7,500 bond.  Vitaly reunited with his attorney, Roger P. Foley.  After filing in on the case, the charges were immediately reduced to felony battery, a third degree felony.   After a few months, the case was reduced to a misdemeanor and eventually dismissed.

During the World Cup in Qatar on December 9th 2022 Vitaly ran on the field during the match between Argentina and The Netherlands. He had the words "Vitaly the GOAT" labelled on his chest.

References

External links

 
 

1992 births
Living people
Russian male comedians
People from Murmansk
Russian emigrants to the United States
Russian YouTubers
Streakers
Prank YouTubers
American YouTubers
Russian expatriates in the United States
YouTube channels launched in 2011
YouTube controversies
People charged with assault
YouTube boxers